The 1936 Sam Houston State Bearkats football team represented Sam Houston State Teachers College (now known as Sam Houston State University) as a member of the Lone Star Conference (LSC)  during the 1936 college football season. Led by first-year head coach Henry O. Crawford, the Bearkats compiled an overall record of 2–7 with a mark of 0–4 in conference play, and finished fifth in the LSC.

Schedule

References

Sam Houston State
Sam Houston Bearkats football seasons
Sam Houston State Bearkats football